Qila Kalar Wala is a village of Sialkot District situated at Narowal Muridke road in Pakistan.

Villages in Sialkot District